Carl Hancock Rux is an American poet, playwright, novelist, essayist, recording artist, journalist, curator, social practice installation artist and professor in the Department of Theater at CalArts University. Described in the NY Times as "a breathlessly inventive multimedia artist" focused on "art, race, memory and power",[1] Rux is the author of several books, including the Village Voice Literary Prize-winning collection of poetry, Pagan Operetta, the novel, Asphalt, and the OBIE Award-winning play,Talk and five albums. He appears as a frequent collaborating artist, most notably on Gerald Clayton's album Life Forum[2] (Grammy nomination for Best Jazz Instrumental Album[3]) and as co-author of the staged incarnation of Steel Hammer by Julia Wolfe, the 2010 Pulitzer Prize-nominated work, created with Anne Bogart.[4] Rux is the author/performer of the Lincoln Center commissioned experimental short poetic film The Baptism, a tribute to civil rights activists John Lewis and C. T. Vivian, directed by Carrie Mae Weems (an official selection in the 2022 Segal Center Film Festival on Theater and Performance).

Rux is Co-Artistic Director and a board member of Mabou Mines, an award-winning New York City-based experimental mixed media art and social service company founded in 1970 by David Warrilow, Lee Breuer, Ruth Maleczech, JoAnne Akalaitis, and Philip Glass; a board member of 122 Community Center "122 CC" (formerly known as Performance Space 122) and Associate Artistic Director/Curator in Residence of Harlem Stage/The Gate House, formerly known only as Aaron Davis Hall (winner of the Association of Performing Arts Presenters William Dawson Award for Programming Excellence and Sustained Achievement in Programming). Rux is also the  Multidisciplinary Editor at The Massachusetts Review (recipient of the 2021 Whiting Literary Magazine Prize for Journalism).  Mr. Rux is the inaugural curator/director of Lincoln Center, Park Avenue Armory and Harlem Stage's annual Juneteenth Celebration, I Dream a Dream That Dreams Back at Me.

Rux is the recipient of numerous awards, including the Alpert Award in the Arts, the Doris Duke Award for New Works, the Doris Duke Charitable Fund, the New York Foundation for the Arts Prize, the Bessie Award; and a Global Change Maker award by WeMakeChange.Org as well as shortlisted for the United States Artists Fellowship.

Rux's archives are housed at the Billy Rose Theater Division of the New York Public Library, the Archives of American Art, Smithsonian Institution as well as the Film and Video/Theater and Dance Library of the California Institute of the Arts.

Early life
Rux was born Carl Stephen Hancock in Harlem, New York.[1] His biological mother, Carol Jean Hancock, was diagnosed with paranoid schizophrenia, and institutionalized shortly after the birth of Rux’s older brother. Rux was born the result of an illegitimate pregnancy (while his mother was under the care of a New York City psychiatric institution. The identity of Rux's biological father is unknown.) He was placed under the guardianship of his maternal grandmother, Geneva Hancock (née Rux), until her death of cirrhosis of the liver due to alcoholism.[2] At four years of age, he entered the New York City foster care system, where he remained until he was placed under the legal guardianship of his great uncle James Henry Rux and his wife Arsula (née Cottrell) Rux and raised in the Highbridge neighborhood of the Bronx. Rux attended PS 73, where he was initially exposed to the theater by director Neema Barnette, who cast Rux in the lead role of Old Judge Mose Is Dead by playwright Joseph White. While attending Roberto Clemente Junior High School, Rux received a scholarship to the Horace Mann School, an independent college preparatory school in the Riverdale section of the Bronx, before transferring to the Fiorello H. LaGuardia High School of Music & Art [3] where he studied visual art. He was exposed to jazz music by his legal guardians, including the work of Oscar Brown Jr., John Coltrane, Billie Holiday, Miles Davis, Max Roach and Abbey Lincoln, Rux eventually double-majored in music/voice,[3] and sang with the Boys Choir of Harlem. He also joined the Harlem Writers Workshop, a Columbia University-based summer journalism training program for inner-city youth. At the age of 15, Rux was legally adopted by his guardians, and his surname changed to Rux. Upon graduation from high school, he entered Columbia College where he studied in the Creative Writing Program; took private acting classes at both HB studios; trained with Gertrude Jeanette's Hadley Players and took private acting lessons with actor Robert Earl Jones (father of actor James Earl Jones). Rux continued his studies at Columbia University, American University of Paris, and the University of Ghana at Legon.[4]

Career

Writer/Poet
Working as a Social Work Trainer while moonlighting as a freelance art and music critic, Rux became a founding member of Hezekiah Walker's Love Fellowship gospel choir. Influenced by the Lower East Side poetry and experimental theater scene, Rux collaborated with poets Miguel Algarin, Bob Holman, Jayne Cortez, Sekou Sundiata, Ntozake Shange; experimental musicians David Murray, Mal Waldron, Butch Morris, Craig Harris, Jeanne Lee, Leroy Jenkins, Odetta, Steve Earle, Jim Carroll as well as experimental theater artists Laurie Carlos, Robbie McCauley, Ruth Maleczech, Lee Breuer, Reza Abdoh, and others.

He is one of several poets (including Paul Beatty, Tracie Morris, Dael Orlandersmith, Willie Perdomo, Kevin Powell, Maggie Estep, Reg E. Gaines, Edwin Torres, and Saul Williams) to emerge from the Nuyorican Poets Cafe, most of whom were included in the poetry anthology Aloud, Voices From the Nuyorican Poets Cafe, winner of the 1994 American Book Award. His first book of poetry, Pagan Operetta, received the Village Voice Literary prize and was featured on the weekly's cover story: "Eight Writers on the Verge of (Impacting) the Literary Landscape". Rux is the author of the novel Asphalt and the author of several plays. His first play,  Song of Sad Young Men (written in response to his older brother's death from AIDS), was directed by Trazana Beverly and starred actor Isaiah Washington. The play received eleven AUDELCO nominations. His most notable play is the OBIE Award-winning Talk, first produced at the Joseph Papp Public Theater in 2002. Directed by Marion McClinton and starring actor Anthony Mackie, the play won seven OBIE awards.

Recording Artist/Performing Artist
Rux was first featured as a recording artist, on Reg E. Gaines CD Sweeper Don't Clean My Streets (Polygram). As a musician, his work is known to encompass an eclectic mixture of blues, rock, vintage R&B, classical music, futuristic pop, soul, poetry, folk, psychedelic music and jazz. His debut CD, Cornbread, Cognac & Collard Green Revolution (unreleased), was produced by Nona Hendryx and Mark Batson, featuring musicians Craig Harris, Ronnie Drayton and Lonnie Plaxico. Discovered by Sony 550 President Polly Anthony, Rux released his debut CD Rux Revue recorded and produced in Los Angeles by the Dust Brothers, Tom Rothrock, and Rob Schnapf. Rux recorded a follow-up album, Apothecary Rx, (selected by French writer Phillippe Robert for his 2008 publication "Great Black Music": an exhaustive tribute of 110 American albums by African American artists. His fourth studio CD, Good Bread Alley, was released by Thirsty Ear Records, and his fifth, "Homeostasis" (CD Baby), was released in May 2013. Rux has written and performed (or contributed music) to a proportionate number of dance companies, including the Alvin Ailey American Dance Theater;  Bill T. Jones/Arnie Zane Dance Company; Jane Comfort & Co. and Ronald K. Brown's "Evidence" among others.

 Eminem: The New White Negro

Journalism
Rux has been published as a contributing writer in numerous journals, catalogs, anthologies, and magazines, including Interview magazine, Essence magazine, The New York Times, the Los Angeles Times, aRude Magazine, Nka: Journal of Contemporary African Art (founded by fellow art critics Okwui Enwezor, Chika Okeke-Agulu and Salah Hassan) and American Theater Magazine.

Actor

Theater
Rux studied acting at the Hagen Institute (under Uta Hagen), the Luleå National Theatre School (Luleå, Sweden), and the National Theater of Ghana (Accra), and has appeared in several theater projects, most notably originating the title role in the folk opera production of The Temptation of St. Anthony, based on the Gustave Flaubert novel, directed by Robert Wilson with book, libretto, and music by Bernice Johnson Reagon and costumes by Geoffrey Holder. The production debuted as part of the Ruhr Triennale festival in Duisburg, Germany, with subsequent performances at the Greek Theater in Siracusa, Italy; the Festival di Peralada in Peralada, Spain; the Palacio de Festivales de Cantabria in Santander, Spain; Sadler's Wells in London, Great Britain; the Teatro Piccinni in Bari, Italy; the Het Muziektheater in Amsterdam, Netherlands; the Teatro Arriaga in Bilbao and the Teatro Espanol in Madrid, Spain. The opera made its American premiere at the Brooklyn Academy of Music / BAM Next Wave Festival in October 2004 and official "world premiere" at the Paris Opera, becoming the first all-African-American opera to perform on its stage since the inauguration of the Académie Nationale de Musique - Théâtre de l'Opéra. Combining both his dramatic training and dance movement into his performance, Rux's performance was described by the American press as having "phenomenal charisma and supreme physical expressiveness...(achieving) a near-iconic power, equally evoking El Greco's saints in extremis and images of civil rights protesters besieged by fire hoses." Rux has also appeared in several plays and performance works for theater, as well as in his own work.

Radio
Rux was the host and artistic programming director of the WBAI radio show, Live from The Nuyorican Poets Cafe; contributing correspondent for XM radio's The Bob Edwards Show and frequent guest host on WNYC as well as NPR. He co-wrote and performed in the national touring production of NPR Presents Water±, directed by Kenny Leon.

Academia
Rux is formally the Head of the MFA Writing for Performance Program at the California Institute of Arts and has taught and or been an artist in residence at Brown University, Hollins University, UMass Amherst, Duke University, Stanford University, University of Iowa, University of Wisconsin at Madison, and Eugene Lang New School for Drama, among others.

He has mentored award-winning writers, including recipients of the Yale Drama Prize, Whiting Writers Award, Princess Grace Award, and BBC African Performance Playwriting Award.

Arts-Related Jury Panels
Rux has served on panels for foundations, cultural councils, and cultural centers for the arts such as Creative Capital, the CalArts Alpert Award, New York Foundation for the Arts, The Mellon Foundation, the Rockefeller MAP Fund, The MacDowell Colony, The Shed, and others.

Activism
Rux joined New Yorkers Against Fracking, organized by singer Natalie Merchant, calling for a fracking ban on natural gas drilling using hydraulic fracturing. A concert featuring Rux, Merchant,  actors Mark Ruffalo and Melissa Leo and musicians Joan Osborne, Tracy Bonham, Toshi Reagon, Citizen Cope, Meshell Ndegeocello and numerous others was held in Albany, N.Y., and resulted in public protests.

Rux was a co-producer (through a partnership between MAPP International and Harlem Stage) and curator of WeDaPeoples Cabaret, an annual event regarding citizens without borders in a globally interdependent world. A longtime resident and homeowner in Fort Greene, Brooklyn, Carl Rux worked with the Fort Greene Association and New York philanthropist Barbaralee Diamonstein-Spielvogel to erect a cultural medallion at the Carlton Avenue home where novelist Richard Wright lived and penned his seminal work, Native Son.

Personal life
Rux's great uncle, Rev. Marcellus Carlyle Rux (January 8, 1882 - January 5, 1948), was a graduate of Virginia Union University, and principal of The Keysville Mission Industrial School  (later changed to The Bluestone Harmony Academic and Industrial School), a private school founded in 1898 by several African-American Baptist churches in Keysville, Virginia at a time when education for African-Americans was scarce to non-existent. For about 50 years, the school had the largest enrollment of any black boarding school in the east and sent many graduates on to college. For the first five years, Marcellus Carlyle Rux was a teacher in the institution. Such was the record he made that he was promoted to the principalship in 1917. Under his administration, the school reached its highest enrollment and had its greatest period of prosperity. The post-Civil war school was one of the first in the nation and was permanently closed in 1950. The school's still-existent structure once featured a girl's and boy's dormitory and President's dwelling and is eligible for listing on the National Register of Historic Places.  Marcellus Carlyle Rux is listed in History of the American Negro and his Institutions.

Rux's younger brother is a New York City Public School Teacher, and his cousin is a New York City middle school principal. Rux's older brother died of AIDS-related complications.

Rux's home, a Victorian Brownstone in the Fort Greene Brooklyn section of New York City, has been photographed by Stefani Georgani and frequently featured in home decor magazines and coffee table books internationally, including Elle Decor UK.

References

External links
 
 

1971 births
21st-century American novelists
550 Music artists
African-American theatre
American artists
21st-century American dramatists and playwrights
American male novelists
American male musicians
American singer-songwriters
Bessie Award winners
Columbia College (New York) alumni
Living people
Obie Award recipients
University of Massachusetts Amherst faculty
Writers from Brooklyn
21st-century American poets
American male poets
American male essayists
American male dramatists and playwrights
21st-century American essayists
21st-century American male writers
Novelists from New York (state)
Novelists from Massachusetts
People from Fort Greene, Brooklyn
Thirsty Ear Recordings artists
American male singer-songwriters